Walter Kenneth Martinez Jr. (born February 12, 1959) is an American attorney and politician who served as a member of the New Mexico House of Representatives from 1998 to 2016. He served as House Majority Leader from 2005 to 2013. That year, he was elected as Speaker of the House, and served until 2015.

Early life and education

Martinez was born in Albuquerque, New Mexico, on February 12, 1959, into a political family. His parents were Walter K. Martinez and Dolores Martinez. He is Roman Catholic. His father was a member of a group of Hispanic and liberal Anglo legislators called the Mama Lucy Gang, who controlled the New Mexico House of Representatives in the early-1970s. He served as House Speaker from 1971 to 1978.

Martinez earned a bachelor's degree from the University of New Mexico in 1981 and a Juris Doctor from the Notre Dame Law School in 1984. His siblings also went into law. His older sister, Camille Olguin, became a state district judge, and his younger brother, Kevin Martinez, became a lawyer.

Career

Martinez was elected to the New Mexico House of Representatives in 1998, taking office in 1999 and serving to the present. 

In the June 1, 2010, Democratic primary Martinez was elected by 2,130 votes. He was unopposed in the November 2, 2010, general election for the 69th District, winning with 5,379 votes.

Martinez served as House majority leader for eight years up to 2013. Martinez was elected as Speaker of the House in 2012, sworn in by Governor Susana Martínez on 15 January 2013. He served until 2015, when he was In 2014 he was still speaker of the house. Martinez resigned from office in 2016 and was succeeded by Harry Garcia.

He was co-chair of the legislative council, capitol buildings planning commission and jobs council. He was a member of legislative committees on Labor and Human Resources, Rules and Order of Business, and Voters and Elections.

Personal life 
As of 2014, Martinez was married and resident in Grants, New Mexico. Martinez operates a law practice with his brother in Albuquerque.

References

Sources

External links
Follow the Money - W. Ken Martinez 2006 2004 2002 2000 1998 campaign contributions

Speakers of the New Mexico House of Representatives
Democratic Party members of the New Mexico House of Representatives
Living people
1959 births
Hispanic and Latino American state legislators in New Mexico
People from Albuquerque, New Mexico
21st-century American politicians
People from Grants, New Mexico